Paris Las Vegas is a casino hotel on the Las Vegas Strip in Paradise, Nevada. It is owned and operated by Caesars Entertainment and has a 95,263 square-foot casino with over 1,700 slot machines.

The front of the hotel suggests the Louvre, Musée d'Orsay, and Paris Opera House.

The Paris is linked via a promenade to its sister property, Horseshoe Las Vegas, through which it is linked to the Las Vegas Monorail at the Horseshoe & Paris station.

History
In May 1995, Bally Entertainment, owner of the adjacent Bally's Las Vegas, announced the project at a shareholders meeting. Paris was designed by architectural companies Leidenfrost/Horowitz & Assoc., Bergman, Walls & Assoc. and MBH Architects. The design architect of the project was Bergman Walls Associates. Herbert Horowitz, Partner of Leidenfrost/Horowitz & Assoc., was executive architect and signed all plans.

Bally broke ground for the Paris Las Vegas on April 18, 1997, and construction began in May on the  parcel. It was built at an estimated cost of $760 million. Original plans for the Eiffel Tower called for a full-scale replica, however that would have interfered with the nearby Harry Reid International Airport and designers therefore reduced it to approximately 1:2 scale. The hotel is 33 stories tall. A unique architectural aspect of the Paris is that the back legs of its Eiffel Tower actually come down through the ceiling into the casino floor.

Paris Las Vegas opened on September 1, 1999, with fireworks being shot from the Eiffel Tower. French actress Catherine Deneuve flipped a switch, turning on all of Paris' lights, including the various crystal chandeliers in the main lobby.

On January 31, 2007, Paris Las Vegas premiered its new show The Producers, headlined by David Hasselhoff. There were reports of friction between the show's producers and Hasselhoff and he announced he would leave May 6 due to other commitments. The Producers refocused on Max, played by Tony Danza. Danza came on as the celebrity actor for the show until The Producers closed on February 9, 2008. Barry Manilow headlined at the Paris from March 6, 2010, to December, 2012.

To counter the 2008–2009 economic downturn, Harrah's focused on marketing its properties to specific segments of the population; as a result Paris is being marketed heavily towards gay and lesbian travelers.

Beginning in 2010, a series of improvement projects were started that would see some removal of the Parisian theme. The French greeters around the property began to be phased out, and in early 2010 a major remodel project was started at the front entrance. The project debuted in Spring 2011 and included a new nightclub called 'Chateau' and the largest Sugar Factory store on the Strip. It was announced in early December 2010 that the hotel's famous steakhouse Les Artisies would close at the end of January 2011 to make way for Gordon Ramsay Steak, which opened in June 2011.

The Chateau nightclub opened in early March, 2011. Outside is a  terrace overlooking the Strip with VIP cabanas and three additional bars. During the day, the terrace serves as a beer garden and restaurant, opening at 10 a.m.

In 2015, Hexx Kitchen & Bar and Hexx Chocolate & Confexxions was opened in the space formerly occupied by the Sugar Factory. Hexx was the first "bean-to-bar" chocolate maker in Nevada.

In 2016, Beer Park by Budweiser opened on a 10,000-square-foot (930 m²) deck overlooking the Las Vegas Strip. It is Las Vegas' first rooftop bar and grill.

Film history

Films
 In the 2006 miniseries 10.5: Apocalypse, Paris is seen sinking in a massive sinkhole caused by acidic water undermining the underground limestone (barring the Eiffel Tower replica, which collapses while it sinks) along with the rest of the city.
 In the 2007 film Resident Evil: Extinction, Paris is seen buried in sand, along with the rest of Las Vegas, several years after a zombie apocalypse. One of the characters climbs the Eiffel Tower replica to escape a horde of zombies.
 In the 2009 film 2012, Paris, along with the rest of The Strip, is destroyed.
 In the 2010 animated film Despicable Me, Gru is shown to have stolen the Eiffel Tower replica along with the Statue of Liberty replica from the New York-New York Hotel and Casino.
 The Eiffel Tower replica is destroyed by the female MUTO in the 2014 film Godzilla.
 Pteranodons land on the Eiffel Tower in the post-credits scene of 2018's Jurassic World: Fallen Kingdom.

Television
 Lester Nygaard (Fargo) got Insurance Salesman of the Year 2007 Prix there.
 In the 2015 Disney XD crossover Lab Rats vs. Mighty Med, Adam, Bree, Chase, Leo, Skylar, Oliver, and Kaz battle the Incapacitator on the Eiffel Tower replica.

Gallery

See also
 List of casinos in Nevada
 The Parisian Macao - similarly themed hotel in Macau, China.

References

External links
 
 

1990s architecture in the United States
1999 establishments in Nevada
Architecture of the Las Vegas Valley
Caesars Entertainment
Casino hotels
Casinos completed in 1999
Casinos in the Las Vegas Valley
Eiffel Tower reproductions
Hotel buildings completed in 1999
Hotels established in 1999
Las Vegas Strip
Novelty buildings in Nevada
Resorts in the Las Vegas Valley
Skyscraper hotels in Paradise, Nevada
Towers completed in 1999